The Alice Springs Public Library is a free public library service in Australia.  While the library provides traditional library services to the community of Alice Springs, it also supplies  a unique distance service to the remote people of Central Australia.  While officially named the Nevil Shute Memorial Library, the name is little used.

Location
The physical library is on the corner of Leichhardt and Gregory Terraces, Alice Springs.  However, remote users can also access the library collection via the Online Catalogue. This catalogue provides access to not only the Alice Springs library service, but also the collections of all public libraries in the Northern Territory.

Alice Springs Collection 

The Alice Springs Collection is a collection of materials which relate to the historical, scientific and cultural heritage of Central Australia. This is a reference collection and items are not available for loan. They can be viewed in the Library during regular opening hours. All items in the collection are not for loan.

The Alice Springs Collection also has a significant digital collection and holds editions of the Centralian Advocate, from 1947-2015, in PDF format and over 6000 images, most of which are from the Central Australian Historical Images Collection, on an intranet system available on computers inside the collection room.

Akaltye Antheme - Giving Knowledge 

The Akaltye-Antheme (pronounced 'aculcha andum') collection, a collection of materials produced for and by the Aboriginal people of Central Australia, is alongside the Alice Springs Collection, one of the major special collections at the library.

Meaning 'giving knowledge' in Arrernte, Akaltye-Antheme offers visitors to the library an insight into contemporary Indigenous issues and culture and is designed for browsing. All items in the collection are not for loan.

A sub-set of the collection is the Local Languages Collection which consists of early reader texts and books for adults in more than 8 different Central Australian languages.

This collection was recently awarded first prize in the Australian Library and Information Association (ALIA) Library Stars competition. This acknowledged the unique nature of this collection, which contains material not held by any other library or archive service.

Whereas other Australian library services are attempting to provide library services to the Indigenous people of Australia, this collection is part of an effort by past librarians which has been so successful that up to 80% of those using the library at any given moment may be Aboriginal.

References

External links 
Alice Springs Public Library Official site
Alice Springs Town Council
Online Library Catalogue
Northern Territory Library

Public libraries in Australia
Libraries in the Northern Territory
Alice Springs